The Leavenworth Case is a 1923 American silent mystery film directed by Charles Giblyn and starring Seena Owen, Martha Mansfield, and Wilfred Lytell. It is based on the 1878 novel The Leavenworth Case by Anna Katharine Green, which was later also adapted into a 1936 sound film of the same title.

Cast

References

Bibliography
 Connelly, Robert B. The Silents: Silent Feature Films, 1910-36, Volume 40, Issue 2. December Press, 1998.
 Goble, Alan. The Complete Index to Literary Sources in Film. Walter de Gruyter, 1999. 
 Munden, Kenneth White. The American Film Institute Catalog of Motion Pictures Produced in the United States, Part 1. University of California Press, 1997.

External links

1923 films
1923 mystery films
American silent feature films
American mystery films
American black-and-white films
Films directed by Charles Giblyn
Vitagraph Studios films
Films based on American novels
1920s English-language films
1920s American films
Silent mystery films